South Korean singer-songwriter Kim Jong-hyun (most often credited as Jonghyun) has released two studio albums, two compilation albums, one extended play, nine singles and six soundtrack songs. Jonghyun began his career in 2008 as a member of the boy band Shinee. Early on in his career, he recorded songs for the soundtracks of various television shows, such as "So Goodbye" (2011), which sold over 400,000 downloads. 

He debuted as a soloist with the release of his first extended play, Base, on January 12, 2015. The EP topped the South Korean Gaon Album Chart and spawned the number-one single "Déjà-Boo". Follow-up single "Crazy (Guilty Pleasure)" also charted in the top five. His first compilation album, entitled Story Op.1, was released on September 17, 2015, reaching the top three on the Gaon Album Chart. Jonghyun released a collaboration single with Heritage titled "Your Voice" on March 18, 2016, for the project SM Station. On May 24, 2016, he launched his first studio album, She Is, containing a total of nine songs. The album peaked atop the Gaon Album Chart, selling over 90,000 copies. On December 9, 2016, he released the song "Inspiration" for SM Station. 

Jonghyun released his second compilation album, titled Story Op.2, on April 24, 2017. Its lead single, "Lonely", gained success following Jonghyun's suicide in December 2017, rising to number one on the Gaon Digital Chart.
His final album, Poet  Artist, was released posthumously, on January 23, 2018. It became Jonghyun's first album to rank on the Billboard 200, making him the fourth Korean soloist to appear on the chart. In South Korea, it topped the Gaon Album Chart, and was later certified Platinum by the Korea Music Content Association (KMCA) for selling 250,000 copies.

Albums

Studio albums

Compilation albums

Extended plays

Singles

Collaborations

Soundtrack appearances

Other appearances

Other charted songs

Music videos

Notes

References

External links 
  

discography
Discographies of South Korean artists
Pop music discographies